The Green McAdoo School in Clinton, Tennessee, was the community's segregated elementary school for African American children until 1965. The school was completed in 1935, and designed by architect Frank O. Barber of Knoxville.  It is now a museum and is listed on the National Register of Historic Places.

The Green McAdoo School deteriorated after its closure, but was reopened as a museum and cultural center in 2006. Federal grants and local government funding helped to pay for renovations to the building. A set of life-size bronze statues of the "Clinton 12," the 12 African American students who attended Clinton High School in the fall of 1956 when the high school was desegregated under court order, is displayed outside the school's front entrance.

In 2018, the Green McAdoo Cultural Center became a part of the Tennessee State Museum system.

See also
 Clinton High School, Tennessee

References

External links
 Green McAdoo Cultural Center website

School buildings on the National Register of Historic Places in Tennessee
Museums in Anderson County, Tennessee
History museums in Tennessee
African-American history of Tennessee
African-American museums in Tennessee
Historically segregated African-American schools in Tennessee
Buildings and structures in Anderson County, Tennessee
Defunct schools in Tennessee
School buildings completed in 1935
Museums established in 2006
2006 establishments in Tennessee
National Register of Historic Places in Anderson County, Tennessee
1935 establishments in Tennessee